Lobelia niihauensis, commonly known as the Niihau lobelia, is a rare species of flowering plant in the bellflower family that is endemic to Hawaii. It is known only from the islands of Oahu and Kauai and is thought to be extirpated from Niihau. It is federally listed as an endangered species of the United States.

This plant grows only on exposed dry to mesic steep cliffs from 125 to 725 m. Predation, probably by goats, may have eliminated it from any other type of habitat. It produces long terminal inflorescences of magenta flowers.

References

External links

USDA Plants Profile for Lobelia niihauensis
Botany.hawaii.edu: Carr's Hawaiian Lobelia

niihauensis
Endemic flora of Hawaii
Biota of Kauai
Biota of Oahu
Plants described in 1931